The Tarleton branch was a  long single track branch railway line in Lancashire, England, that ran from  on the West Lancashire Railway to  via one intermediate station, .

History
The branch was built alongside the Leeds and Liverpool Canal's Rufford Branch by the West Lancashire Railway opening in 1881 for goods. After increasing financial difficulties West Lancashire Railway was taken over by the Lancashire and Yorkshire Railway on 1 July 1897.  On 3 June 1912 a passenger service was introduced between the newly opened  and  but this proved short-lived. The branch closed for passengers on 1 October 1913 and for goods in 1930.

References

External links
 Tarleton station and line history on Disused Stations
 The line on a 1947 OS Map

Closed railway lines in North West England
Lancashire and Yorkshire Railway
Historic transport in Lancashire